The Loyola Public School is a private Catholic primary and secondary school located in the village of Nallapadu outside Guntur in the state of Andhra Pradesh, India. Established by the Jesuits in 1964, the school follows the ICSE curriculum till class 10 and the ISC for class 11 and 12. The school's motto is Natus Ad Majora ("Born for Greater Things").

History
Loyola Public School is managed and administered by members of the Society of Jesus (Jesuits). a worldwide organization of religious men numbering about 16,000 of whom 3,000 work in the 14 provinces of India. In Andhra Pradesh about 160 Jesuits work in schools and colleges, youth services, social work centres, parishes, mission out-reach programmes, and other Church ministries. In presecondary and secondary education alone, in South Asia, 820 Jesuits run 447 schools with a student population of 344,000. 

Two names will go down in history as pioneers of Loyola Public School, Guntur. Late Rt. Rev. Ignatius Mummadi, Bishop of Guntur, Catholic Diocese brought the Jesuits to Guntur to start the school. He mustered the services of Fr. T. Balaiah, S.J., to acquire the land. Commissioned to go ahead with the project, Jesuit Fr. Papaiah, the pioneer and chief architect of the school, made Loyola Public School a reality with the help of a Jesuit brother, Stanislaus. The foundation stone of this second Jesuit educational institution in Andhra Pradesh was laid on 30 January 1964 by the Chief Minister of the State Dr. N. Sanjeeva Reddy. Fr. L.D. Murphy, S.J., became the first principal of the school which opened on 13 July 1964 with 13 boys.

Academics - ICSE
As mentioned previously, the school follows the ICSE and ISC curriculum. That includes mandatory classes and board exams in English language and literature, Physics, Chemistry and Biology. Mathematics, History-Civics and Geography, one optional subject and one 2nd language for the ICSE. Loyola Public School offers Computer Applications as the optional and a choice between Hindi and Telugu for the 2nd language. 

Lectures for the above subjects are delivered throughout the year giving a comprehensive understanding of the subject and a perfect preparation for the board exam. The school has continuously given a 100% result (all students attempting the exam exceed the set limit for pass mark ie- 35%) for decades at a stretch.

The school has a progressive teaching approach using smart learning tools when required. The learning is concept based instead of rote memorization. The School has a strict 'English conversation only' policy for students and staff at campus. Physics, Chemistry and Biology are taught with practical application. The separate labs for each of the sciences aid in this way of teaching. The school also has several computer labs and English language labs as well.

Co-Curricular and Extra-Curricular Activities
Although LPS is highly focused on academics, it believes in a holistic growth of students.

Sports- 
LPS has one of the best sports facilities in the entire state. A huge sports compound with several full sized football and hockey fields, a cricket field, Clay and Synthetic courts for Basketball, Volleyball and Badminton. Olympic sized synthetic tennis court. A swimming pool. Table tennis and other indoor game facilities are also present.

The NCC- 
The school has an army wing troop with 150 cadets on its roll. Boys and girls of classes 8 and 9 join the National Cadet Corps (India). Boys are enrolled under the 25 (A) Bn NCC, Guntur, and girls are enrolled under 10 (A) Bn NCC, Guntur. 

There is an active alumni club, with Mr. GVSR Krishna Reddy as president and Fr. U. Antony, S.J., as director.

See also

 List of Jesuit schools

References

Private schools in Andhra Pradesh
Christian schools in Andhra Pradesh
Jesuit primary schools in India
Schools in Guntur district
Educational institutions established in 1964
1964 establishments in Andhra Pradesh
Jesuit secondary schools in India